Flight from Singapore is a 1962 British drama film directed by Dudley Birch and starring Patrick Allen, Patrick Holt and William Abney.

Plot
Two ex-RAF pilots set-up an airline between Singapore and Hong Kong. They run into trouble when their plane crash lands.

Cast
 Patrick Allen - John Scott 
 Patrick Holt - Squadron Leader Hill 
 William Abney - Flight Lieutenant Bob Elliott 
 Harry Fowler - Sergeant Brooks 
 Denis Holmes - Smithy 
 Jane Jordan Rogers - Cleo 
 Rosemary Dorken - Joan Elliott

References

External links

1962 films
1962 drama films
British drama films
British aviation films
1960s English-language films
1960s British films